Dorothée Le Maître (1 September 1896 – 26 January 1990) was a French paleontologist known for her studies of Devonian flora and fauna in North Africa and Sub-Saharan Africa.

Early life and education 
Le Maître was educated at Angers Free University and received her bachelor's degree from the Catholic University of Lille in 1926. She remained there for her doctoral studies and earned her Ph.D. in 1934.

Career and research 
Her first paper was published in 1926, the same year she earned her bachelor's degree. After her Ph.D., Le Maître became a faculty member at the University of Lille, where she was a geology researcher. Her research included work on the Spongiomorphides and included comparative research of North African and Sub-Saharan fossils to those of Europe.

Honors and awards 
In 1941, Le Maître was awarded the Prix Fontannes, and in 1956 she received the Kuhlmann Prize. In 1959, she was honored by the French Academy of Sciences with the Grand Prix Bonnet. She was the president of the Société Géologique du Nord in 1949.

References 

1896 births
1990 deaths
Women paleontologists
French paleontologists
20th-century French women scientists